Josip Sesar (born 17 January 1978) is a Croatian professional basketball coach and former player for Cibona of the Croatian League and ABA League.

Playing career
Sesar started training basketball when he was ten. He was 182 cm tall at the time. In 1992 he left Zrinjski Mostar for Split. Since the youth coach did not consider him a prospect, his father took him to Zagreb. In 1993, he started his professional career there. After six successful seasons with Zagreb, in 1999, Sesar signed his second professional contract, namely with Cibona. At the 2000 NBA Draft he was drafted by the Seattle SuperSonics and then traded to the Boston Celtics. However, he never played a game for the Celtics or any other NBA team, making him 1 of 8 players from the 2000 NBA Draft to never play in the league.

National team career 
Sesar was the MVP of the 1996 European Championship for junior men, held in France. He also participated in the 1995 World Championship for junior men. 

He was part of senior Croatia national team selections at the 1997 EuroBasket, 1999 EuroBasket qualification and the 2001 EuroBasket.

Coaching career 
In July 2011, Sesar became a coach for the youth selections of Cibona. In July 2022, Cibona hired Sesar as their new head coach.

References

External links 
Profile at FIBA
Profile at proballers.com
Profile at realGM

1978 births
Living people
Croats of Bosnia and Herzegovina
ABA League players
Croatian men's basketball players
HKK Široki players
KK Cibona players
KK Gorica coaches
KK Split players
KK Zadar players
KK Zagreb players
Seattle SuperSonics draft picks
Shooting guards
Basketball players from Mostar